Isolina Carrillo (December 9, 1907 – February 21, 1996) was a Cuban composer, singer and pianist. She was a member of the vocal group Conjunto Siboney.

At the age of eleven she made her musical debut replacing a pianist that called in sick in her father’s orchestra. She came from a very musical family; her brothers and father were musicians. She studied in the Municipal Conservatory of Havana.

In the 1940s, she achieved her greatest recognition as a composer of boleros, guarachas and sones. Her songs included "Fiesta de besos", "Canción sin amor", "Increíble" and the most famous of all her works, "Dos gardenias", composed in 1945. This last composition has been covered by many  singers such as Daniel Santos, Antonio Machin, Pedro Vargas, Maria Rita, among others.

References

External links
 Trabajores articles (Spanish)

1907 births
1996 deaths
Cuban composers
20th-century Cuban women singers
Cuban pianists
Cuban women pianists
20th-century composers
Guaracha songwriters
20th-century pianists
20th-century women composers
20th-century women pianists